Children of Dreams is a 1931 American pre-Code musical operetta drama film photographed entirely in Part Technicolor and produced and distributed by Warner Bros.

The film was directed by Alan Crosland. Children of Dreams was the second original operetta written especially for the screen by Oscar Hammerstein II and Sigmund Romberg. This team had previously worked on the musical Viennese Nights, which had proved to be a success. The film had the misfortune of being released at a time when the public had grown weary of musicals and did poorly at the box office.

It was the only full-scale musical to be released in the summer of 1931. Although Children of Dreams was filmed in color and exhibited in a few select areas in color, Warner Bros. decided to circulate black-and-white prints in many areas as a cost saving measure due to the backlash against musicals.

Plot
One day, Molly Standing (Margaret Schilling) is picking apples in her father's apple orchard in California, with her friend Gertie (Marion Byron), when they meet two boys, Tommy Melville (Paul Gregory) and Gus Schultz (Tom Patricola). Molly falls in love with Tommy while Gertie falls in love with Gus. They plan a double wedding.

Gerald Winters and his mother, who are wealthy art patrons, hear Molly singing, and, at Gerald's suggestion, since he is very attracted to her, they sponsor her to study in Italy. Molly is reluctant to go but finally accepts when she discovers her father is in need of money. She leaves on the day that Tommy had hoped would be their wedding day. He says goodbye to her before attending Gertie and Gus's wedding ceremony.

Molly becomes a success in Rome. She returns to the United States to sing at the Metropolitan Opera House in New York City, where she is again a great success. After the performance, Tommy attends the party which has been given by Gerald and his mother. Molly asks Tommy to sing, but her society friends do not think much of his singing. Realizing that Molly now lives in a world far apart from his, Tommy breaks off his engagement and returns to the orchards.

Molly stays in New York for two years and then moves on to San Francisco for a concert stop. Although she is supposed to marry Gerald soon, she is unhappy. She goes to her father's orchards to visit her old friend Gertie, to see how things are going with her. She happens to run into Tommy, and they rekindle their love and are married. Before they leave on their honeymoon, the doctor (Charles Winniger) informs Molly's manager and Tommy that Schilling has lost her voice and will never sing again, except perhaps, a lullaby.

Cast
Margaret Schilling as Molly Standing
Paul Gregory as Tommy Melville
Tom Patricola as Gus Schultz
Bruce Winston as Hubert Standing
Charles Winninger as Dr. Joe Thompson
Marion Byron as Gertie

Songs
"Fruit Picker's Song"
"Oh, Couldn't I Love That Girl"
"Her Professor"
"Children of Dreams"
"Sleeping Beauty"
"If I Had a Girl Like You"
"Seek Love"
"That Rare Romance"
"Goodbye, My Love, Goodbye"
"Yes Sir"

Preservation status
The film is believed to be lost. The soundtrack, which was recorded separately on Vitaphone disks, may survive in private hands.

See also
List of lost films
List of incomplete or partially lost films
List of early color feature films

References

External links

1931 films
Lost American films
Warner Bros. films
American romantic musical films
Films directed by Alan Crosland
American black-and-white films
1930s romantic musical films
1930s musical drama films
American musical drama films
1931 drama films
1930s English-language films
1930s American films